Large mock-olive is a common name for several plants and may refer to:

Notelaea longifolia
Notelaea venosa